Second Baptist Society of Ulysses, now known as Trumansburg Conservatory for the Arts, is a historic Baptist church located at Trumansburg in Tompkins County, New York. The building has a rectangular footprint comprising a front gable main block, built between 1849 and 1851, with a later frame addition with a hipped roof completed about 1902.  It measures 54.5 feet wide by 85 feet deep, with an additional 10 feet for the porch, or verandah. The porch is supported by four fluted Doric order columns in the  Greek Revival style.  The church was sold to the Trumansburg Conservatory for the Arts in 1982.

It was listed on the National Register of Historic Places in 2001.

References

External links
Trumansburg Conservatory of Fine Arts website

Churches on the National Register of Historic Places in New York (state)
Baptist churches in New York (state)
Greek Revival church buildings in New York (state)
Churches completed in 1851
19th-century Baptist churches in the United States
Churches in Tompkins County, New York
1851 establishments in New York (state)
National Register of Historic Places in Tompkins County, New York